Jeremy Stover (born August 20, 1972) is an American country music songwriter and record producer. Stover is an alumnus of Belmont University.  Stover has written singles for Tim McGraw, Jon Pardi, Wynonna, Martina McBride, and others.

His first number 1 single as a songwriter was "Wherever You Are", recorded by Jack Ingram, which was also the first number 1 single for Big Machine Records.
 
Stover is best known for his work with Justin Moore, whom he helped sign with Big Machine's Valory imprint. He co-wrote and produced Moore's number 1 single "Small Town USA".

Stover was one of three writers for the song, Scarecrow, released by LJ Music on July 12, 2019.

In 2014, Stover founded independent music publisher RED Creative Group. In 2018, the company expanded with the launch of RED Creative Management in partnership with Red Light Management.

Songs written by Jeremy Stover

References

American country record producers
American country songwriters
American male songwriters
Belmont University alumni
Living people
Place of birth unknown
1972 births